Weizhou or Wei Prefecture was a zhou (prefecture) in imperial China centering on modern Weifang, Shandong, China. It existed (intermittently) from 596 until 1376 not long after the founding of the Ming dynasty.

References
 

Prefectures of the Sui dynasty
Prefectures of the Tang dynasty
Prefectures of Later Tang
Prefectures of Later Zhou
Prefectures of Later Jin (Five Dynasties)
Prefectures of Later Liang (Five Dynasties)
Prefectures of Later Han (Five Dynasties)
Prefectures of the Song dynasty
Prefectures of the Jin dynasty (1115–1234)
Prefectures of the Yuan dynasty
Former prefectures in Shandong